Stratford is a town in Sherman County, Texas, United States. The population was 2,017 at the 2010 census, up from 1,991 in 2000. It is the county seat of Sherman County.

History
The city is named for Stratford, Virginia.

Geography

Stratford is located at  (36.336158, –102.071451).  According to the United States Census Bureau, the city has a total area of 2.0 square miles (5.3 km), all of it land.

The Rita Blance National Grasslands are due west.

Climate

Stratford has a semi-arid climate (BSk) with long, hot summers and short, cool, and somewhat snowy winters.

Demographics

2020 census

As of the 2020 United States census, there were 1,939 people, 702 households, and 554 families residing in the city.

2000 census
At the 2000 census there were 1,991 people, 722 households, and 535 families living in the city. The population density was 980.2 people per square mile (378.7/km). There were 794 housing units at an average density of 390.9/sq mi (151.0/km).  The racial makeup of the city was 83.02% White, 0.30% African American, 0.65% Native American, 0.05% Asian, 14.41% from other races, and 1.56% from two or more races. Hispanic or Latino of any race were 30.44%.

Of the 722 households 39.2% had children under the age of 18 living with them, 64.1% were married couples living together, 6.9% had a female householder with no husband present, and 25.9% were non-families. 24.4% of households were one person and 11.4% were one person aged 65 or older. The average household size was 2.68 and the average family size was 3.21.

The age distribution was 30.5% under the age of 18, 6.6% from 18 to 24, 26.0% from 25 to 44, 21.4% from 45 to 64, and 15.5% 65 or older. The median age was 36 years. For every 100 females, there were 98.3 males. For every 100 females age 18 and over, there were 92.8 males.

The median household income was $32,656 and the median family income  was $37,955. Males had a median income of $27,113 versus $19,524 for females. The per capita income for the city was $16,790. About 11.2% of families and 13.8% of the population were below the poverty line, including 18.7% of those under age 18 and 13.8% of those age 65 or over.

Transportation
Stratford is at the intersection of US Route 287 and US Route 54, and is the western terminus of Texas State Highway 15.

The nearest major airport, Liberal Mid-America Regional Airport, is 82 miles and two states away in Liberal, Kansas, although Rick Husband Amarillo International Airport is only slightly further away, at 91 miles.

Education
The city of Stratford is served by the Stratford Independent School District and home to the Stratford High School Elks.

References

External links

 Sherman County

Cities in Sherman County, Texas
Cities in Texas
County seats in Texas